Catocala elocata, the French red underwing,  is a moth of the family Erebidae. It is found in Central Europe, Southern Europe, North Africa, Anatolia, Uzbekistan, and Kazakhstan.

The larvae feed on poplar and willow.

Subspecies
Catocala elocata elocata
Catocala elocata locata Staudinger, [1892] (Uzbekistan)

References

External links

Lepiforum.de
Moths and Butterflies of Europe and North Africa
UK Moths
Vlindernet.nl 

elocata
Moths described in 1787
Moths of Europe
Moths of Asia
Moths of Africa
Taxa named by Eugenius Johann Christoph Esper